, is a Japanese social philosopher and university professor.

About
Mishima studied philosophy, German and comparative literature and cultural studies at the University of Tokyo. Between 1970 and 1980 he spent several years in Germany as a scholarship holder of the DAAD and the Alexander von Humboldt Foundation. From 1994 to 1995 he was a guest at the Wissenschaftskolleg zu Berlin. He was a professor at Osaka University until he moved to Tokyo University of Economics and Business as Professor of Social Philosophy and Contemporary Philosophy. Mishima is considered an important mediator of the so-called critical theory in East Asia. Other focal points of his work are modern philosophy, above all the reception of the works of Friedrich Nietzsche and Walter Benjamin, the theory and empiricism of selective and multiple modernity as well as intellectual discourses in Germany.

Awards and honors
Philipp Franz von Siebold Prize (1987)
Eugen and Ilse Seibold Prize (2001)
Honorary doctorate from the Free University of Berlin (2011)
Richard von Weizsäcker Fellow (2017)

Selected bibliography

Books

References

Living people
1942 births
University of Tokyo alumni
Academic staff of the University of Tokyo
20th-century Japanese philosophers
Academic staff of Osaka University